Pharmacyclics LLC is an American biopharmaceutical company based in Sunnyvale, California. It is primarily focused on the development of cancer therapies.  In 2017, Xynomic Pharmaceuticals acquired all global rights to Abexinostat, Pharmacyclics' primary commercial product.

Acquisition by AbbVie
In March 2015, Chicago-based biopharmaceutical firm AbbVie announced it would acquire Pharmacyclics, as well as its lead anti-cancer compound ibrutinib (Imbruvica) for $21 billion. As part of the deal, AbbVie will pay $261.25 per share in a mixture of both cash and AbbVie equity. The merger is expected to close in mid-2015.

Duggan  will receive over $3.55 billion from the sale of Pharmacyclics to AbbVie in  "one of the biggest paydays ever from the buyout of a publicly held company."

As CEO and Chairman of Pharmacyclics since 2008, Robert Duggan has opted not to receive compensation from the company.

References

External links

AbbVie
Biotechnology companies of the United States
Companies based in Sunnyvale, California
Pharmaceutical companies established in 1991
Orphan drug companies
Companies formerly listed on the Nasdaq
1991 establishments in California
2015 mergers and acquisitions
Corporate subsidiaries